Sargassum ringgoldianum is a brown alga species in the genus of Sargassum. The ethanol extract of S. ringgoldianum contains phlorotannins of the bifuhalol type, which shows an antioxidative activity.

References 

 Characters of new algae, chiefly from Japan and adjacent regions, collected by Charles Wright in the North Pacific Exploring Expedition under Captain James Rodgers. Harvey W.H., Proceedings of the American Academy of Arts and Sciences, 1860, volume 4, pages 327-335

External links 
 algaebase

Fucales
Plants described in 1860